Atelopus chiriquiensis, the Chiriqui harlequin frog or Lewis' stubfoot toad, is an extinct species of toad in the family Bufonidae that was found in the Cordillera de Talamanca in Costa Rica and western Panama (Province and Bocas del Toro Provinces). Its natural habitats were stream margins in lower montane wet forests and rainforests. Its elevational range was  asl.

Description
Atelopus chiriquiensis was a moderately sized toad: males measure  in snout–vent length and females . Colouring was highly variable and usually different between males and females. They had weakly developed and relatively inconspicuous poison glands scattered over the head and dorsum; nevertheless, they produced tetrodotoxin, a potent neurotoxin.

Anatomy

Conservation status
This once locally abundant species has not been seen in Costa Rica since 1996 and is considered extinct in the country. It is also thought to have disappeared from Panama as there are no records since late 1990s. The decline was probably linked to chytridiomycosis. Habitat loss and introduced trout were also threats. The IUCN Red List now considers Atelopus chiriquiensis extinct.

References

chiriquiensis
Amphibians of Costa Rica
Amphibians of Panama
Amphibians described in 1936
Taxonomy articles created by Polbot
Taxa named by Benjamin Shreve